Johnson Glacier is a glacier flowing north between the McDonald Heights and Bowyer Butte to merge with the Getz Ice Shelf on the coast of Marie Byrd Land, Antarctica. It was mapped by the United States Geological Survey from surveys and U.S. Navy air photos, 1959–65, and was named by the Advisory Committee on Antarctic Names for Roland L. Johnson, Boatswain's Mate, U.S. Navy, a crew member of the  during exploration of this coast in the 1961–62 season.

See also
Mount Rubin de la Borbolla
Strawn Pass

References

Glaciers of Marie Byrd Land